The Gstaad Palace is a luxury hotel in Gstaad, Switzerland. It was opened in December 1913 and is known as a notable destination for various celebrities and politicians. It is a member of The Leading Hotels of the World.

History

In 1905, Robert Steffen, a local schoolteacher in Gstaad, purchased land on which to build a new hotel. He recruited investors from Lausanne and Geneva for the project originally called the "Royal-Hôtel and Winter Palace." The hotel was opened in December 1913, with a design from Dutch architect, Adrien van Dorsser. In 1915, it held a men's tennis tournament on outdoor clay courts. The tournament would eventually become the Swiss Open. Soon after the hotel's inauguration, World War I broke out in Europe, inhibiting the Palace's success at first. It saw growth in the 1920s but was again hampered by the Great Depression. Ernst and Sylvia Scherz took over as directors of the hotel in 1938. During World War II, a vault in the hotel's cellar was used to safeguard money and other valuables held by the Swiss Bank Corporation (now known as UBS). That vault is currently a fondue restaurant.

Financial struggles associated with low patronage during the war prompted the hotel's majority owner to sell in 1947. The hotel has been operated by the Scherz family ever since. After the war, the hotel became a common vacation spot for royalty, including King Leopold III, the King of Afghanistan, and members of the Spanish royal family. In the 1950s, Scherz helped establish events like the Menuhin Festival Gstaad to increase business at the hotel.

The following decade, he brought in prominent entertainers to perform at the hotel, including Maurice Chevalier, Louis Armstrong, Ella Fitzgerald, Marlene Dietrich, and numerous others. Scherz's son, Ernst Andrea, took over managing duties from his father in 1968. Throughout the 1960s and 70s, the hotel gained a reputation as a celebrity getaway destination. Actors like Elizabeth Taylor, Richard Burton, Sophia Loren, Grace Kelly, Roger Moore, and many others spent a great deal of time there. In the early 1970s, the hotel opened its first nightclub, GreenGo. Exterior shots of the hotel appear in the 1975 film, The Return of the Pink Panther, with Peter Sellers in his role as Inspector Clouseau.

In 2000, Michael Jackson offered to purchase the hotel, but the owners declined. In 2001, Ernst Andrea Scherz handed over management duties to his son, Andrea Scherz. The hotel also added a spa to include sauna and hammam areas. In 2013 and 2014, the sixth floor suites were refurbished. It received a renovation in 2018 which incorporated more suites at the property.

In April 2022, Roman Polanski began shooting the upcoming film The Palace in the hotel.

Description
The Gstaad Palace was built in a Swiss chalet style on a hill overlooking the town of Gstaad. It has guest rooms and suites, restaurants, a basement nightclub (GreenGo), a spa, a traditional alpine hut (Walig Hut), indoor and outdoor pools, and numerous other amenities. It is a member of the independent hotel collective known as The Leading Hotels of the World.

References

External links

Hotels in Switzerland
The Leading Hotels of the World
Buildings and structures in the canton of Bern
Hotels established in 1913
Hotel buildings completed in 1913
Swiss chalet architecture
20th-century architecture in Switzerland